US Post Office-Potsdam is a historic post office building located at Potsdam in St. Lawrence County, New York. It was designed and built in 1932–1933, and is one of a number of post offices in New York State designed by the Office of the Supervising Architect of the Treasury Department, James A. Wetmore.  The building is in the Classical Revival style and is a two-story, "U" shaped structure clad in limestone. The main facade features a colossal seven-bay recessed portico supported by Doric order columns and flanked by Grecian style cast-iron urns.

It was listed on the National Register of Historic Places in 1989.

References

Potsdam
Neoclassical architecture in New York (state)
Government buildings completed in 1933
Buildings and structures in St. Lawrence County, New York
National Register of Historic Places in St. Lawrence County, New York